Altagracia Contreras (born 18 February 1974) is a Dominican Republic judoka. She competed in the women's lightweight event at the 1992 Summer Olympics.

References

External links
 

1974 births
Living people
Dominican Republic female judoka
Olympic judoka of the Dominican Republic
Judoka at the 1992 Summer Olympics
Place of birth missing (living people)
Pan American Games medalists in judo
Pan American Games silver medalists for the Dominican Republic
Judoka at the 1991 Pan American Games
Medalists at the 1991 Pan American Games
20th-century Dominican Republic women
21st-century Dominican Republic women